Tropical cyclones are named to avoid confusion with the public and streamline communications, as more than one tropical cyclone can exist at a time. However, standards vary from basin to basin.

See also 

Tropical cyclone
List of historical tropical cyclone names
Lists of tropical cyclone names
European windstorm names
Atlantic hurricane season
Pacific hurricane season
South Atlantic tropical cyclone

References 

Named